Graeme William Schultz (born 17 May 1953) is a former Australian rules footballer who played with Essendon in the Victorian Football League (VFL).

Schultz was a forward and rover, recruited to Essendon from Warracknabeal in the Wimmera Football League. He kicked four goals on his league debut in 1971, against Hawthorn, which helped him to a season tally of 29 goals; this was just two behind the club's leading goalkicker that year, Alan Noonan. His 16 games in 1974 were deemed to be some of his best, as he finished third in the W. S. Crichton Medal count.

He made the decision to move to Western Australia after the 1974 season, for study purposes, but Essendon initially refused to grant him a clearance, which meant he could not play in the WANFL. They later gave in, and he played the second half of the 1975 season for Subiaco. Despite appearing in just 12 games, Schultz almost won the Sandover Medal, finishing only four votes behind winner Alan Quartermaine.

After six more seasons at Subiaco, Schultz was convinced by new Essendon coach Kevin Sheedy to return to the VFL in 1981. In his first season back, he played in the 1981 Night Premiership and bettered his previous season's goal tally by kicking 30 league goals, including a game-winning goal against Richmond in Round 13 at Windy Hill after taking a courageous mark going back with the flight of the ball. Injury kept him to five games in 1982, and in his first appearance of the 1983 VFL season, against St Kilda, he broke his leg. He did not play another VFL game for Essendon, but he was a member of their 1983 reserves premiership–winning team.

He spent part of the 1984 season with Footscray, without playing a senior game, before ending the year at Camberwell.

References

External Links
 
 
 

1953 births
Australian rules footballers from Victoria (Australia)
Essendon Football Club players
Subiaco Football Club players
Camberwell Football Club players
Warracknabeal Football Club players
Living people